Air Onix was a Ukrainian airline headquartered in Simferopol (Crimea, Ukraine).

History
On 28 April 2012, Air Onix launched its first flight from Simferopol (Simferopol Airport) to Kyiv (Zhuliany Airport).

On 7 November 2013, ILFC repossessed two of its Boeing 737 aircraft leased to Air Onix for unpaid debts. In December 2013, Air Onix was suspended from the IATA, its Air Operator Certificate being withdrawn by the Ukrainian aviation authorities. Two further Boeing 737s were put into storage.

Destinations
As of December 2013 Air Onix served following destinations:

Asia

Tel Aviv - Ben Gurion International Airport

Istanbul - Sabiha Gökçen International Airport

Caucasus

Yerevan - Zvartnots Airport

Tbilisi - Tbilisi International Airport

Europe

 Tivat - Tivat Airport

 Moscow - Domodedovo International Airport
 Saint Petersburg - Pulkovo Airport

 Bratislava - M. R. Štefánik Airport

 Kyiv - Zhuliany International Airport Base
 Simferopol - Simferopol International Airport Base

Fleet

The Air Onix fleet consisted of the following aircraft (as of November 2013):

References

External links 

Defunct airlines of Ukraine
Airlines established in 2007
Airlines disestablished in 2013
Ukrainian companies established in 2007
2013 disestablishments in Ukraine